On 13 March 2016, jihadist fighters from al-Nusra Front and Jund al-Aqsa launched an overnight attack against the 13th Division headquarters in the town of Ma'arrat al-Nu'man. According to social media activists in support of the Syrian opposition, Jabhat al-Nusra attacked Division 13 over local protesters and demonstrations.

Division 13 capture 
The Division headquarters located in Ma'arrat al-Nu'man was overrun in a nighttime attack by a joint Al-Nusra Front and Jund al-Asqa assault force. Two Division storage facilities that were allegedly filled with the U.S.-built anti-tank TOW missiles were surrendered to the attackers. This claim was denied by Division 13 leader Ahmad al-Sa'aoud, insisting Al-Nusra Front captured only 'light weapons and ammunition' and that all of the groups anti-tank missiles and mortars were secured. The Division 13’s depots in Maarat al-Nu'maan and three nearby towns were overrun; Hesh, Khan Shaykhun and Tal Aas. An unspecified number of armored vehicles and a tank were reportedly captured. Al-Nusra fighters conducted door-to-door searches, ultimately detaining 40 Division fighters including several top leaders of the rebel group. By the end of the battle, Division 13 abandoned all its posts in Maarat al-Nu'man and the bulk of its leadership fled to Turkey. However, civilians opposed to the takeover took to the streets and stormed Nusra's HQ in the city, freeing some prisoners. A total of 11 combatants died during the clashes.

Aftermath 

Unrest and civilian resistance against al-Nusra rule continued for coming months. On 12 June 2016, a demonstration took place in Maarat al-Nu'man against al-Nusra's authoritarianism, with protestors calling Abu Muhammed al-Jolani an "Iranian nark".

From 6 to 8 June of the next year, clashes broke out between Tahrir al-Sham and Sham Legion in Maarrat al-Nu'man. The 13th Division and the Free Police joined the fighting on 8 June. By the evening of 8 June, HTS captured both the 13th Division and the Sham Legion's headquarters in Maarat al-Nu'man and killed Col. Tayser al-Samahi, the head of the Free Police in the town. On 9 June, a ceasefire agreement was signed between the Free Idlib Army and Tahrir al-Sham in the town and the latter ordered the 13th Division to be disbanded.

References 

Military operations of the Syrian civil war in 2016
March 2016 events in Syria
Military operations of the Syrian civil war involving the al-Nusra Front
Idlib Governorate in the Syrian civil war
Battles of the Syrian civil war
Military operations of the Syrian civil war involving the Free Syrian Army